Oksana Boturchuk (born 12 September 1984) is a Paralympic athlete from Ukraine competing mainly in category T12 sprint events.

She competed in the 2008 Summer Paralympics in Beijing, China.  There she won a gold medal in the women's 100 metres - T12 event, a silver medal in the women's 200 metres - T12 event, a silver medal in the women's 400 metres - T12 event and finished eighth in the women's Long jump - F12 event.

At the 2020 Summer Olympics in Tokyo, Japan, she won three silver medals.

In August 2021, a movie about her life titled Pulse was released.

She experienced vision loss after an auto accident.

References

External links
 

Paralympic athletes of Ukraine
Ukrainian female sprinters
Paralympic gold medalists for Ukraine
Paralympic silver medalists for Ukraine
Paralympic bronze medalists for Ukraine
Living people
1984 births
Medalists at the 2008 Summer Paralympics
Medalists at the 2012 Summer Paralympics
Medalists at the 2020 Summer Paralympics
Athletes (track and field) at the 2008 Summer Paralympics
Athletes (track and field) at the 2012 Summer Paralympics
Athletes (track and field) at the 2020 Summer Paralympics
Paralympic medalists in athletics (track and field)
21st-century Ukrainian women